Blaise Winter (born January 31, 1962) is a motivational speaker as well as a former American football player and coach. Winter played defensive end for the Indianapolis Colts, San Diego Chargers and Green Bay Packers in the National Football League, and coached for the University of Central Florida.

College career
After playing football, basketball and track at Tappan Zee High School, Winter took a tour of colleges in the Northeast United States after his senior year of high school, looking for an opportunity to play college football. Syracuse was the only school to offer Winter a scholarship, and that was only after a previous commit decommitted. Winter was named a team captain and most valuable player during his senior season with the Orange.

Professional career

Indianapolis Colts
Winter was drafted by the Indianapolis Colts in the second round (35th overall) of the 1984 NFL Draft. He started all but one game during his rookie season, and was named to some all-rookie teams. A shoulder injury landed him on injured reserve during his sophomore season; the Colts released him at the end of the year.

San Diego Chargers (first stint)
Winter played with the San Diego Chargers during the 1987 season, which was shortened by a players strike.

Green Bay Packers
Winter was traded to the Green Bay Packers in early 1988 in exchange for past considerations. He started most of the 1988 and 1989 seasons, but played in a limited role in 1990 and was cut by the Packers early in the 1991 calendar year.

Following his release from the team, Winter made telephone calls to every NFL team and also made a highlight reel which was shipped to every team. He started driving to team facilities in an effort to get signed, but did not draw any interest until the offseason, when the San Francisco 49ers, Minnesota Vikings and Los Angeles Rams showed interest, and Winter participated in workouts for the Vikings and 49ers.

San Diego Chargers (second stint)
Winter was signed by the San Diego Chargers in the time period preceding the 1992 NFL Draft. He originally sat third-string on the depth chart, but later started during the season after Joe Phillips refused to agree to a contract and George Thornton did not play well. He played the 1993 season before being cut by the team.

Tampa Bay Buccaneers
Winter was a member of the Tampa Bay Buccaneers for a brief time in the 1994 offseason.

San Diego Chargers (third stint)
The Chargers brought Winter back for the 1994 season, but a cut block by Dave Cadigan of the Cincinnati Bengals tore Winter's anterior cruciate ligament in September, ending his season.

Buffalo Bills
Winter signed with the Buffalo Bills in  spring 1995 after an onslaught of injuries to the team's defensive line, but he himself spent the year on the injured reserve list.

After playing
Winter, his wife and children moved to Appleton, Wisconsin after his playing career ended. He wrote an autobiography, entitled "A Reason to Believe". The University of Central Florida hired Winter as a defensive line coach for the 2012 season. Winter spent one season on the coaching staff and then departed, citing a lack of family time. After coaching, Winter became a motivational speaker.

Personal life
Winter was born with a cleft palate and he later grew tumors in both of his ears. He dabbled in martial arts in high school. Winter was diagnosed with a brain tumor in 2016.

References

External links
 
 UCF Knights profile
 HearStrong profile
 Lutz Agency profile
 World Class Speakers profile

1962 births
Living people
American deaf people
People from Blauvelt, New York
Sportspeople from the New York metropolitan area
Players of American football from New York (state)
Deaf players of American football
American football defensive linemen
Syracuse Orange football players
Indianapolis Colts players
San Diego Chargers players
Green Bay Packers players
Tampa Bay Buccaneers players
Buffalo Bills players
Ed Block Courage Award recipients